Dan Zoreka  is an Anglican bishop in Uganda: he has been  Bishop of Kinkiizi since 2010.

Zoreka was educated at Uganda Christian University. He was health co-ordinator for the Diocese of Kinkiizi from 2004 to 2010.

References

Anglican bishops of Kinkiizi
21st-century Anglican bishops in Uganda
Uganda Christian University alumni
Year of birth missing (living people)
Living people